Theater an der Rott is the theatre of Kreis (district) Rottal-Inn in the southeastern part of Bavaria, Germany. It is situated in the Lower Bavarian town Eggenfelden.

Theatres in Bavaria